Zevi Wolmark (born August 19, 1962) is an American film and theatre actor and artist. His on-screen career was at its peak in the late 1980s and early 1990s. He is chiefly known for his appearance in the 1988 TV Series Superboy.

Biography
Zevi Wolmark was born in San Francisco, northern California. He studied acting at the Juilliard School in New York City where he also launched his career performing in off-Broadway shows. By the late 1980s, Wolmark had moved to the big screen. During his career he has appeared in more than a dozen film and TV productions.

Filmography

References

External links

Zevi Wolmark at the Open Media DataBase

1962 births
Living people
Male actors from San Francisco
Juilliard School alumni
American male film actors
American male voice actors
20th-century American male actors
21st-century American male actors